Ratri Ke Yatri  (English: Night traveler) is an Indian Hindi-language drama web series directed by Deepak Thakur for Hungama Digital Media Entertainment original. Rashami Desai and Monalisa are cast in both season. 

The series stars Rashami Desai along with Shefali Jariwala, Antara Biswas, Shiny Doshi, Barkha Bisht Sengupta, Anju Mahendru, Shakti Arora,Adaa Khan, Sharad Malhotra, and Priyal Gor, in key roles. Its first season was made available for streaming on OTT platform Hungama Digital Media Entertainment and his partner networks from 23 July 2020.

The second season of the series was released on Hungma Play on 10 Oct, 2022,

References

Hindi-language web series